Bak Yeong-gyu of the Suncheon Bak clan (Hangul: 박영규, Hanja: 朴英規) was a Silla general who married Gyeon Hwon's daughter and always followed him by did a great succession in helping the establishment of the Hubaekje kingdom. He was the father of Lady Dongsanwon, Queen Mungong, and Queen Munseong.

Family 
Wife: Princess Gyeom Aebok
 Mr. Bak (박씨) – 1st son.
 Mr. Bak (박씨) – 2nd son.
Lady Dongsanwon (동산원부인) – 1st daughter.
Queen Mungong (문공왕후) – 2nd daughter.
Queen Munseong (문성왕후) – 3rd daughter.

Life
In March 935, when Bak's father-in-law, Gyeon Hwon got rebelled and imprisoned at Geumsan Temple (금산사, 金山寺) by his oldest son, Gyeon Singeom (견신검), then in June, Gyeon escaped from there and went to Goryeo's exile place. In September 936, after secretly discussed and consulted with his wife, Princess Gyeon Aebok, Bak sent an envoy to Goryeo for express his intention to defection and said that he would respond and welcome those armies if Wang Geon raised a righteous army. Wang Geon then rejoiced greatly about this and treated that envoy generously and sent he back to Bak, also promised for the future of their peoples and country. Later, when Wang Geon finally won in attacked the Hubaekje Kingdom, Bak then responded Wang's request and contributed to the unification of Later Three Kingdoms.

After this, Wang Geon highly praised Bak with given 1,000 fields (1,000경(頃)) to him. Wang Geon also visited Bak's wife with 35 horses (역마 35필) and gave their two sons a post (벼슬). Seeing Bak's contribution in helped Wang established the new Goryeo Dynasty, Bak then officially held the title as Three Major Grand Lords (삼중대광, 三重大匡), along with Ryu Cheon-gung and Hwangbo Je-gong who also held this title.

Since Bak was the one of Samjung Daegwang, both him and his wife had a nice-relationship with Taejo of Goryeo, they regard and treated each other like a sibling. Because of this too, Bak's oldest daughter became Taejo's 17th wife and the other two daughters became both of the first and second wife of Taejo's son, Jeongjong of Goryeo.

In popular culture
Portrayed by Im Hyuk-joo in the 2000–2002 KBS1 TV series Taejo Wang Geon.
Portrayed by Kim Sang-soon in the 2002–2003 KBS TV series The Dawn of the Empire.
Portrayed by Choi Byung-mo in the 2016 SBS TV series Moon Lovers: Scarlet Heart Ryeo.

See also
Who also held the title as Samjung Daegwang:
Ryu Cheon-gung
Hwangbo Je-gong

References

External links
Bak Yeong-gyu on Encykorea .
Bak Yeong-gyu on Doosan Encyclopedia .
Bak Yeong-gyu on Goryeosa .

Year of birth unknown
Year of death unknown
Date of birth unknown
Date of death unknown
Place of birth unknown
Place of death unknown
People related with Late Three Kingdoms
Baekje people
Silla people
Goryeo people